Runnymede is a rural locality and town in the local government areas of Southern Midlands and Glamorgan–Spring Bay in the Central and South-east regions of Tasmania. The 2016 census determined a population of 71 for the state suburb of Runnymede.

History
Runnymede was gazetted as a locality in 1960.

Geography
Most of the boundaries of the locality are survey lines.

Road infrastructure
The Tasman Highway (A3) enters from the south-west and runs through via the town to the east, where it exits. Route C312 (Woodsdale Road) starts at an intersection with A3 and runs north until it exits.

References

Localities of Southern Midlands Council
Localities of Glamorgan–Spring Bay Council
Towns in Tasmania